Oscar Davis (March 6, 1896 – May 28, 1958) was an American Negro league outfielder in the 1920s.

A native of Harshmanville, Ohio, Davis played for the Dayton Marcos in 1926. In five recorded games, he posted one hit in 17 plate appearances. Davis died in Dayton, Ohio in 1952 at age 68.

References

External links
 and Seamheads

1896 births
1958 deaths
Dayton Marcos players
Baseball outfielders
Baseball players from Ohio
People from Montgomery County, Ohio
20th-century African-American sportspeople